Rabbit Lake is a special service area within the Rural Municipality of Round Hill No. 467 in Saskatchewan, Canada. It dissolved from village status on October 30, 2015. It originally incorporated as a village on April 13, 1928. The population was 113 at the 2006 Canada Census a substantial 29.9% increase from the 2001 Canada Census.

Demographics 
In 2006, Rabbit Lake had a population of 113 living in 61 dwellings, a 29.9% increase from 2001.

See also 
 List of communities in Saskatchewan
 Villages of Saskatchewan

References 

Round Hill No. 467, Saskatchewan
Special service areas in Saskatchewan
Former villages in Saskatchewan
Populated places disestablished in 2015
Division No. 16, Saskatchewan